is a type of Japanese pottery (Stoneware) traditionally from Yokkaichi, Mie. It is therefore also known as Yokkaichi-Banko ware.

It is believed to have originated in the 18th century.

Most products are teacups, teapots, flower vases, and sake vessels.

References

External links 

 Banko no Sato Center

Culture in Mie Prefecture
Japanese pottery
Yokkaichi